Richard John "Richie" Powell (born  1971) is a British wheelchair racer.

After a motorcycle accident on 30 June 1989, at the age of 18, he became paralysed from the chest down. He took up sports when he spent a year at the Rookwood Hospital in Cardiff, as the spinal unit had a sports club.

He represented Great Britain at the 1992 Summer Paralympics in the men's 100 m, and 200m TW3.

He has taken part in the 1994 Commonwealth Games, and the 1998 IPC World Championships.

References

External links
  
 

Year of birth uncertain
1970s births
Living people
British male wheelchair racers
Paralympic athletes of Great Britain
Athletes (track and field) at the 1992 Summer Paralympics
Paralympic wheelchair racers
People with paraplegia
20th-century British people